Mangelas may refer to:
 Mangelas-e Bozorg